The Echo Church and School is a church and school building in Echo, Utah that includes Late Gothic Revival architecture from 1876.  It was listed on the National Register of Historic Places (NRHP) in 1989.

Its two functions made it the center of community life at the turn of the twentieth century.  The building was used mostly as a Presbyterian and Congregational church but also as a school, while a Latter-day Saints congregation later used it.

References

Churches on the National Register of Historic Places in Utah
Gothic Revival church buildings in Utah
Churches completed in 1876
Buildings and structures in Summit County, Utah
Presbyterian churches in Utah
Congregational churches in Utah
School buildings on the National Register of Historic Places in Utah
National Register of Historic Places in Summit County, Utah